Vallejuelo is a town in the San Juan province of the Dominican Republic.

History
The first settlers resided in Rio Arriba of the South in 1880. These people had come from the Cibao region. Then, in 1912, several families of Hondo Valle and El Cercado settled in Vallejuelo and adjacent areas.

References

Sources 
 – World-Gazetteer.com

Municipalities of the Dominican Republic
Populated places in San Juan Province (Dominican Republic)